Beechey is a surname. Notable people with the name include:

 William Beechey (1753–1839), English painter
 Anne Beechey (1764–1833), British portrait painter
 Henry William Beechey (1788–1862) British painter and Egyptologist
 Frederick William Beechey (1796–1856), English naval officer and explorer, son of William
 Richard Brydges Beechey (1808–1895), Anglo-Irish painter and naval officer, son of William
 St. Vincent Beechey (1806–1899), vicar and founder of Rossall School, son of William
 Ernest Beechey (1886–1972), New Zealand cricketer
 Norm Beechey, retired Australian race car driver 
 Adam Beechey (born 1981), Australian racing driver
 Tyler Beechey (born 1981), Canadian ice hockey player

See also 

 Beechey Island, a Canadian Arctic island named after Frederick William
 Lake Beechey, in Nunavut, Canada
 Beachy, a surname
 Beechy, a village in Saskatchewan, Canada